Vahab is both a given name and a surname. Notable people with the name include:

Amir Vahab, Iranian Sufi musician and educator in Persian culture and traditional music
Vahab Saalabi, Iranian paralympic athlete
Vahab Shahkhordeh (born 1936), Iranian sprinter

See also
Vahabism, alternate expression for Wahhabism